Ulvi Indrikson (née Voog; born 18 February 1937) is an Estonian former freestyle swimmer who won a silver medal in the 4×100 m medley relay at the 1958 European Aquatics Championships. She also competed at the 1960 Summer Olympics in the 100 m and 4×100 m freestyle and finished eighth in the 4×100 m relay. During her career she won 11 national (USSR) titles: in the 100 m freestyle (1955–58, 60), 400 m freestyle (1956–60) and 4×100 m freestyle (1958), and set 10 national records. 

Voog graduated from the University of Tartu. She started training in swimming in 1952 and after retirement in 1967 worked as a swimming coach for Dünamo Tallinn (1967–92) and the Soviet swimming team (1977). Around 1960 she changed her name to Indrikson. She is a grandmother of Estonian swimmers Triin, Martti and Berit Aljand. In 1957 she was chosen as the Estonian Sportspersonality of the year.

References

1937 births
Living people
Swimmers at the 1960 Summer Olympics
Estonian female freestyle swimmers
Olympic swimmers of the Soviet Union
Swimmers from Tallinn
European Aquatics Championships medalists in swimming
Soviet female freestyle swimmers
University of Tartu alumni
Estonian swimming coaches